Elena Benítez (born 26 October 1966) is a Spanish taekwondo practitioner. She was born in Málaga. She competed at the 2000 Summer Olympics in Sydney. She won a gold medal in welterweight at the 1999 World Taekwondo Championships, by defeating by Mirjam Müskens in the final. Her achievements at the European Taekwondo Championships include bronze medals in 1986 and 1990, a silver medal in 1994, gold medals in 1996 and 1998, and a silver medal in 2000.

References

External links

1966 births
Living people
Spanish female taekwondo practitioners
Olympic taekwondo practitioners of Spain
Taekwondo practitioners at the 2000 Summer Olympics
World Taekwondo Championships medalists
European Taekwondo Championships medalists
20th-century Spanish women